Mountain Home is an unincorporated community in Kerr County, Texas, United States, at the intersection of State Hwy 27 and State Hwy 41. Mountain Home has a post office with the ZIP code 78058.

The first Mountain Home post office was established in 1879,  with Hiram L Nelson as the first Postmaster.

The Texas Parks and Wildlife Department Fisheries Research Station opened on Highway 27 in 1925.

The Texas Catholic Boys Camp was started in Mountain Home in 1951 by the Society of Mary.

Education
Divide Independent School District is the local school district for elementary school. Divide ISD feeds into Ingram Independent School District, which provides secondary education.

Notable people
Charles Schreiner III, rancher who worked to preserve Texas Longhorn cattle; founder of the Texas Longhorn Breeders Association of America

References

External links
 

Unincorporated communities in Kerr County, Texas
Unincorporated communities in Texas
Populated places established in 1879